Elemér Kondás (born 11 September 1963) is a Hungarian football manager and former player who manages Vasas.

Managerial career

Létavértes
Kondás managed Létavértes between 2004 and 2007.

Debreceni VSC
Kondás was appointed as the manager of Debrecen in 2011. He started the 2011-12 with a seven consecutive wins.

On 25 July 2016, he resigned after a defeat against Vasas SC on the second match day of the 2016–17 Nemzeti Bajnokság I season and after a double defeat in the second qualifying round 2016–17 UEFA Europa League defeat against Torpedo Zhodino. On 8 August 2016, he was replaced by the Portuguese Leonel Pontes.

Kisvárda
On 31 July 2018, he was sacked after two consecutive defeats in the 2018-19 Nemzeti Bajnokság I season.

Győri ETO
On 3 December 2019, he has become the manager of Győr.

Debrecen
On 7 June 2020, he was appointed as the manager of the Debrecen after Zoltán Vitelki was sacked. The club was in relegation zone. Kondás said in an interview that he could have rejected the offer but due his ties to the club he felt responsible.

Vasas
On 6 September 2022, he was appointed as the coach of Vasas SC.

Managerial statistics

References

Sources
Debreceni VSC official website  

1963 births
Living people
Hungarian footballers
Association football defenders
Debreceni VSC players
Hungarian football managers
Nemzeti Bajnokság I managers
Debreceni VSC managers
Kisvárda FC managers
Győri ETO FC managers
Diósgyőri VTK managers
Vasas SC managers